Arius is a genus of catfishes (order Siluriformes) of the family Ariidae. The genus Arius is distributed in brackish and fresh waters of Eastern Africa and south to Southeast Asia.

Defining the limits so that Arius can form a natural grouping has always been a problem. The genus was never properly defined, and many species previously classified in Arius are now in other genera. Recent authors have recognized this genus as nonmonophyetic, rejecting that the genus is a natural grouping. Two unnamed groups are distinguished by accessory tooth plates, which are either very elongated and bearing molar-like teeth, or are oval shaped or subtriangular and bearing acicular (needle-like) or conic teeth. A. jatius lacks these tooth plates, but has been included in this genus based on its adipose fin and lateral line. The recognition of Arenarius as a junior synonym of Arius is tentative and needs to be further investigated.

Arius species have three pairs of barbels, including the fleshy and cylindrical maxillary barbels and two pairs of mental barbels. The base of the adipose fin is moderately long, about half the length of the base of the anal fin.

Species 
Currently, 25 living species are recognized for this genus.

 Arius acutirostris F. Day, 1877
 Arius africanus Günther, 1867 (African sea catfish)
 Arius arenarius (J. P. Müller & Troschel, 1849) (sand catfish)
 Arius arius (F. Hamilton, 1822) (threadfin sea catfish)
 Arius brunellii Zolezzi, 1939
 Arius cous Hyrtl, 1859
 Arius dispar Herre, 1926 (fleshysnout catfish)
 Arius festinus H. H. Ng & Sparks, 2003
 Arius gagora (F. Hamilton, 1822) (Gagora catfish)
 Arius gigas Boulenger, 1911 (giant sea catfish)
 Arius jella F. Day, 1877 (blackfin sea catfish)
 Arius latiscutatus Günther, 1864 (roughhead sea catfish)
 Arius leptonotacanthus Bleeker, 1849
 Arius macracanthus Günther, 1864
 Arius maculatus (Thunberg, 1792) (spotted catfish)
 Arius madagascariensis Vaillant, 1894 (Madagascar sea catfish)
 Arius malabaricus F. Day, 1877
 Arius manillensis Valenciennes, 1840 (Manila sea catfish)
 Arius microcephalus Bleeker, 1855 (squirrelheaded catfish)
 Arius nudidens M. C. W. Weber, 1913
 Arius oetik Bleeker, 1846
 Arius subrostratus Valenciennes, 1840 (shovelnose sea catfish)
 Arius sumatranus (Anonymous, referred to E. T. Bennett, 1830) (goat catfish)
 Arius uncinatus H. H. Ng & Sparks, 2003
 Arius venosus Valenciennes, 1840 (veined catfish)

In addition, a fairly extensive fossil record exists, encompassing several species, but mainly represented by otoliths.

References 

 
Fish of Africa
Fish of Southeast Asia
Extant Maastrichtian first appearances
Catfish genera
Taxa named by Achille Valenciennes